The knockout stage of the 1996–97 UEFA Champions League began on 5 March 1997 and ended with the final at the Olympiastadion in Munich on 28 May 1997. The top two teams from each of the four groups in the group stage competed in the knockout stage. The draw for the quarter-finals was performed before the start of the group stage, with the winners of each group drawn against the runners-up from another; group A was paired with group B, and group C with group D. For the semi-finals, the winners of each tie between teams from groups A and B played against the winners of the corresponding tie between teams from groups C and D.

Each quarter-final and semi-final was played over two legs, with each team playing one leg at home; the team that scored the most goals over the two legs qualified for the following round. In the event that the two teams scored the same number of goals over the two legs, the team that scored more goals away from home qualified for the next round; if both teams scored the same number of away goals, matches would go to extra time and then a penalty shoot-out if the teams could not be separated after extra time.

Bracket

Quarter-finals

|}

First leg

Second leg

Borussia Dortmund won 4–1 on aggregate.

Ajax won 4–3 on aggregate.

Juventus won 3–1 on aggregate.

Manchester United won 4–0 on aggregate.

Semi-finals

|}

First leg

Second leg

Borussia Dortmund won 2–0 on aggregate.

Juventus won 6–2 on aggregate.

Final

Knockout Stage
1996-97